The Sirena-class submarines were the second  sub-class of the 600 Series of coastal submarines built for the  (Royal Italian Navy) during the early 1930s. Of the dozen boats built of this class, only one survived World War II.

Design and description
The Sirena class was an improved and enlarged version of the preceding s. They displaced  surfaced and  submerged. Their crew numbered 45 officers and enlisted men.

For surface running, the boats were powered by two  diesel engines, each driving one propeller shaft. When submerged each propeller was driven by a  electric motor. They could reach  on the surface and  underwater.

The boats were armed with six  torpedo tubes, four in the bow and two in the stern for which they carried a total of 12 torpedoes. They were also armed with a single  deck gun forward of the conning tower for combat on the surface. The anti-aircraft armament consisted of two or four  machine guns.

Ships
SOURCES uboat.net Ametista (AA) Ametista Accessed 1 May 2022uboat.net Diamante (DI) Diamante Accessed 1 May 2022uboat.net Naiade (NA) Naiade Accessed 1 May 2022uboat.net Ondina (ON) Ondina Accessed 1 May 2022uboat.net Sirena (SI) Sirena Accessed 1 May 2022uboat.net Topazio (TP) Topazio Accessed 1 May 2022

See also
 Italian submarines of World War II

Notes

References
 
 

  

Italian 600 Series submarines
 
Sirena